Obidkhon Nomonov (born 5 May 1998) is an Uzbekistani judoka.

He won a medal at the 2021 World Judo Championships.

He won the silver medal in his event at the 2022 Judo Grand Slam Tel Aviv held in Tel Aviv, Israel.

References

External links
 
 

1998 births
Living people
Uzbekistani male judoka
20th-century Uzbekistani people
21st-century Uzbekistani people